Aazam is an upcoming Indian Hindi film featuring Jimmy Sherigill, Abhimanyu Singh, Indraneil Sengupta and Indraneil Sengupta. The FIlm is written and directed by Shravan Tiwari.

Production
Produced under the banner of BMX motion picture, Aazam is a crime thriller. M B Shyani is the  producer. Shravan Tiwari has also given the screenplay and dialogue to the film. Music by Natraj Dastidar and lyrics by Nawav Arzoo. The film has been shot in Mumbai.

Synopsis
Aazam is a crime thriller revolves around the underworld gang who controls the syndicate in the city.Aazam is about the succession battle of mafia don Nawab Khan which revolves around conspiracy, betrayal and deceit.

Cast
 Jimmy Sheirgill as Javed
 Abhimanyu Singh as Kadar
 Indraneil Sengupta as	Dcp Ajay Joshi
 Vivek Ghamande as	Annya
 Govind Namdev as Pratab Shetty
 Raza Murad as	Nawab
 Sayaji Shinde as Madan Shikre
 Ali Khan as Shakir Shaikh
 Anang Desai as Firoz Namazi
 Mushtaq Khan as Tatiya
 Sanjeev Tyagi	as Psi Ankit More
 Alok Pandey as Vishal

References

External links
 Aazam – Rise Of A New Don Movie: Review | Release Date (2023) | Songs | Music | Images | Official Trailers | Videos | Photos | News - Bollywood Hungama
 
 Aazam
 Aazam (2023) - Movie | Reviews, Cast & Release Date - BookMyShow

Upcoming films
Hindi-language drama films
Indian drama films
2023 drama films
2023 films